Chlumec is the name of several places in the Czech Republic:
 Chlumec (Český Krumlov District), a village in the South Bohemian Region
 Chlumec (Ústí nad Labem District), a town in the Ústí nad Labem Region
 Chlumec nad Cidlinou, a town in the Hradec Králové Region

Alternatively:
 Velký Chlumec, a village in the Central Bohemian Region
 Vysoký Chlumec, a village in the Central Bohemian Region
 Kráľovský Chlmec, known until 1948 as Kráľovský Chlumec, a village in Slovakia.